The Cynwyl Elfed television relay station is sited on high ground to the east of the village of Cynwyl Elfed to the north of Carmarthen. It was originally built in mid 1989 as a fill-in relay for UHF analogue colour television covering the village of Cynwyl Elfed and the surrounding community. It consists of a 14 m self-supporting lattice steel mast standing on a hillside which is itself about 115 m above sea level. The transmissions are beamed west to cover the target. The Cynwyl Elfed transmission station is owned and operated by Arqiva.

Cynwyl Elfed transmitter re-radiates the signal received off-air from Preseli about 20 km to the west. When it came, the digital switchover process for Cynwyl Elfed duplicated the timing at Preseli with the first stage taking place on 19 August 2009 and with the second stage being completed on 16 September 2009. After the switchover process, analogue channels had ceased broadcasting permanently and the Freeview digital TV services were radiated at an ERP of 2 W each.

Channels listed by frequency

Analogue television

5 June 1989 - 19 August 2009
Cynwyl Elfed entered service on the same day as did the nearby repeater at Bronwydd Arms.
Being in Wales, both transmitted the S4C variant of Channel 4.

Analogue and digital television

19 August 2009 - 16 September 2009
The UK's digital switchover commenced at Preseli (and therefore at Cynwyl Elfed and all its other relays) on 19 August 2009. Analogue BBC Two Wales on channel 28 was first to close, and ITV1 Wales was moved to that channel for its final three weeks of service. The new digital BBC A mux then started up in 64-QAM and at full power (i.e. 2 W) on channel 25 which had been vacated in the shuffle.

Digital television

16 September 2009 - present
The remaining analogue TV services were closed down and the digital multiplexes took over on the original analogue channels' frequencies.

References

External links
The Transmission Gallery: Cynwyl Elfed

Transmitter sites in Wales